Curt Johannes Braun (11 September 1903 – 5 June 1961) was a German screenwriter.

Selected filmography

 The Tower of Silence (1924)
 The Woman without Money (1925)
 The Wooing of Eve (1926)
 Hunted People (1926)
 The Man in the Fire (1926)
 Derby (1926)
 Lives in Danger (1926)
 The Armoured Vault (1926)
 Chance the Idol (1927)
 The Strange Case of Captain Ramper (1927)
 The Prisoners of Shanghai (1927)
 Alpine Tragedy (1927)
 Miss Chauffeur (1928)
 Life's Circus (1928)
 The Last Fort (1928)
 The House Without Men (1928)
 Der Ladenprinz (1928)
 The Secret Courier (1928)
 Der Herzensphotograph (1928)
 Ariadne in Hoppegarten (1928)
 The Saint and Her Fool (1928)
 The Night of Terror (1929)
 My Heart is a Jazz Band (1929)
 The Call of the North (1929)
 The Three Kings (1929)
 The Green Monocle (1929)
Latin Quarter (1929)
 Never Trust a Woman (1930)
 The Copper (1930)
 The King of Paris (1930, French)
 The King of Paris (1930, German)
 The Land of Smiles (1930)
 Without Meyer, No Celebration is Complete (1931)
 The Big Attraction (1931)
 The Unknown Guest (1931)
 Checkmate (1931)
 Marriage with Limited Liability (1931)
 No More Love (1931)
 The Black Hussar (1932)
 The Ladies Diplomat (1932)
 The Heath Is Green (1932)
 The Mad Bomberg (1932)
 The Fugitive from Chicago (1933)
 The Peak Scaler (1933)
 Inge and the Millions (1933)
 Love and the First Railway (1934)
 Little Dorrit (1934)
 The Double (1934)
 Between Two Hearts (1934)
 Black Roses (1935)
 Romance (1936)
 Stronger Than Regulations (1936)
 The Castle in Flanders (1936)
 Winter in the Woods (1936)
 Serenade (1937)
 The Ruler (1937)
 You and I (1938)
 The Merciful Lie (1939)
 My Daughter Lives in Vienna (1940)
 Goodbye, Franziska (1941)
 Bismarck's Dismissal (1942)
 The Thing About Styx (1942)
 Das Mädchen Juanita (1945)
 Arlberg Express (1948)
 Dear Friend (1949)
 Torreani (1951)
 The Bird Seller (1953)
 The Last Waltz (1953)
 The Immortal Vagabond (1953)
 Baron Tzigane (1954)
 On the Reeperbahn at Half Past Midnight (1954)
 Son of St. Moritz (1954)
 The Angel with the Flaming Sword (1954)
 The Gypsy Baron (1954)
 Secrets of the City (1955)
 Stresemann (1957)
 At the Green Cockatoo by Night (1957)
 Spring in Berlin (1957)
 Victor and Victoria (1957)
 The Copper (1958)
 Peter Voss, Thief of Millions (1958)
 Peter Voss, Hero of the Day (1959)
 Paradise for Sailors (1959)

External links

1903 births
1961 deaths
German male screenwriters
People from Dobre Miasto
People from East Prussia
German male writers
20th-century German screenwriters